Městský fotbalový stadion Srbská is a multi-purpose stadium in Brno, Czech Republic.  It is currently used mostly for football matches and is the home ground of FC Zbrojovka Brno.  The stadium holds 12,550 people and was built in 1926. The club moved into the stadium in 2001, having previously played at Stadion Za Lužánkami.

References

External links
 Photo gallery and data at Erlebnis-stadion.de
 Městský fotbalový stadion at the official FC Zbrojovka Brno website 

Football venues in the Czech Republic
Czech First League venues
Multi-purpose stadiums in the Czech Republic
FC Zbrojovka Brno
Buildings and structures in Brno
Sports venues completed in 1926
1926 establishments in Czechoslovakia
20th-century architecture in the Czech Republic